The Jack Dempsey versus Luis Ángel Firpo fight was a historic boxing fight: It was the first time that a Latin American fighter would challenge for the world heavyweight title, and it would be one of the defining fights of Dempsey's career.

The fight 
Dempsey versus Firpo took place on September 14, 1923, at the Polo Grounds in New York City. Dempsey had been champion since 1919, and Firpo was one of the top heavyweights of the world, nicknamed "El Toro de las Pampas" ("The Bull of the Pampas"). Eighty thousand fans paid to see the fight live. The referee was Johnny Gallagher. 

Firpo displayed his power immediately, when he dropped a lunging Dempsey with a right hand just after the start of the first round. Dempsey landed on one knee, then quickly recovered. Dempsey then rushed onto his rival and proceeded to drop Firpo seven times within a minute and a half. There was no "three knockdown" rule, and Dempsey was permitted to stand over the fallen fighter and immediately knock him down again, as there was yet no rule about going to a neutral corner.

But only half a minute later, towards the end of the first round, Firpo struck again. Trapping Dempsey against the ropes, he connected with another right to Dempsey's chin. Dempsey tumbled backwards out of the ring, and a photographer caught him as his legs pointed upwards. Dempsey hit a ringside writing machine during his fall, and he suffered a severe cut to the back of his head. He was helped back into the ring by the writers at ringside.  Film of the fight shows the referee had reached the count of fourteen by the time he returned. Fighters are allowed 20 seconds to recover instead of the usual ten seconds allowed on an inside-the-ring fall, should they fall outside of the ring.

After that scare, Dempsey recovered, dropping Firpo two more times in the second round, for a knockout victory at the fifty-seven-second mark of that round.

The aftermath 

Dempsey and Firpo both became icons. Dempsey later lost his Heavyweight title to Gene Tunney in two equally historic bouts (see: The Long Count Fight). He served in the military and opened a restaurant in New York before his death in 1983.

Firpo, for his part, was the first Argentinian to ever challenge for the world heavyweight title. Although he did not become a world champion, he was revered in Argentina and most countries in Latin America, with many streets and avenues eventually bearing his name, as well as one of the most important football teams in El Salvador.

Argentinian boxer Oscar Bonavena also fought two great heavyweight champions, losing to Muhammad Ali and Joe Frazier, the latter for the NYSAC's version of the world heavyweight title.  Ultimately, John Ruiz, an American of Puerto Rican descent, became the first boxer of Hispanic and of Latin American descent to win the world Heavyweight title, beating Evander Holyfield in 2001 for the World Boxing Association's version of the title.

Firpo died a wealthy man in 1960. His body rests in the La Recoleta Cemetery in Buenos Aires.

In popular culture 

In 1923-1924, George Bellows painted Dempsey and Firpo, depicting Firpo dropping Dempsey through the ring's ropes on their historic fight. (Although the painting seems to depict Firpo hitting Dempsey with a left, this is in fact the follow-through after Firpo's right sent Dempsey through the ropes.) In 1950, Firpo's second knockdown of Dempsey was named "the most dramatic sports moment of the (20th) century so far".

Quirino Cristiani adapted the fight in an animated short, Firpo-Dempsey (1923). 

This fight is referenced in the 1976 film Rocky by character Mickey Goldmill, who says he fought an opponent on the same date. Moreover, challenger Rocky Balboa floors champion Apollo Creed at the very start of the fight, just as Firpo did to Dempsey. 

This is the fight where Clark Gable's and William Powell's characters meet in the 1934 movie Manhattan Melodrama.

In 1935, the New York Daily News asked five prominent fighters and others involved in boxing to name the greatest ring battle they ever saw. Three of them- light-heavyweight champion Bob Olin, trainer Doc Robb and Madison Square Garden announcer Clem White- responded with the Dempsey-Firpo fight. 

It was mentioned in Steve McQueen's The Sand Pebbles (1966) during the fight between Po-han and Ski.

In the play Twelve Angry Men, the seventh juror (a sports fan who believes the accused is guilty) suggests to his fellow jurors that if juror No. 8 had been "ringside at the Dempsey-Firpo fight, he'd be tryin' to tell us Firpo won" because juror No. 8 is trying to convince the other 11 jurors that the accused may not be guilty. In the 1957 movie version by Sydney Lumet, the fight is also mentioned the same way, though juror No. 7's line is cut short, only managing to say that if juror No. 8 had been "ringside at the Dempsey-Firpo fight, he'd be tryin' to tell us..." before trailing off and moving on to his next line.

In the M*A*S*H episode "Tea and Empathy," a patient says to Dr. B.J. Hunnicutt, "Hey Doc, remember me?" Hunnicut replies, "Yeah, sure. I sat next to you at the Dempsey-Firpo fight".

The fight is mentioned in Julio Cortázar's short story Circe

In the 1957 movie The Spirit of St. Louis, Charles Lindbergh (portrayed by Jimmy Stewart) receives two film canisters, marked “Dempsey" and "Firpo.”

References

External links 

Un KO di 17 secondi (IT) – Dempsey vs. Firpo, un "match" indimenticabile
The fight

1923 in boxing
1923 in sports in New York City
1920s in Manhattan
Boxing matches in New York City
Firpo
September 1923 sports events
Sports in Manhattan
Washington Heights, Manhattan